In mathematical optimization, the Rosenbrock function is a non-convex function, introduced by Howard H. Rosenbrock in 1960, which is used as a performance test problem for optimization algorithms. It is also known as Rosenbrock's valley or Rosenbrock's banana function.

The global minimum is inside a long, narrow, parabolic shaped flat valley. To find the valley is trivial. To converge to the global minimum, however, is difficult.

The function is defined by

Only in the trivial case where  the function is symmetric and the minimum is at the origin.

Multidimensional generalisations

Two variants are commonly encountered.  

One is the sum of  uncoupled 2D Rosenbrock problems, and is defined only for even s:
 

This variant has predictably simple solutions.

A second, more involved variant is
 

For larger  this method breaks down due to the size of the coefficients involved.

Stationary points

Many of the stationary points of the function exhibit a regular pattern when plotted.  This structure can be exploited to locate them.

Optimization examples

The Rosenbrock function can be efficiently optimized by adapting appropriate coordinate system without using any gradient information and without building local approximation models (in contrast to many derivate-free optimizers). The following figure illustrates an example of 2-dimensional Rosenbrock function optimization by
adaptive coordinate descent from starting point . The solution with the function value  can be found after 325 function evaluations.

Using the Nelder–Mead method from starting point  with a regular initial simplex a minimum is found with function value  after 185 function evaluations. The figure below visualizes the evolution of the algorithm.

See also 
Test functions for optimization

References

External links
 Rosenbrock function plot in 3D
 

Mathematical optimization
Polynomials
Functions and mappings